A musalla is a space apart from a mosque, mainly used for prayer in Islam. The word is derived from the verb  (ṣallā), meaning "to pray". It is traditionally used for the Eid prayers and the funeral prayers as per the Sunnah.

A musalla may also refer to a room, structure, or place for conducting salah (canonical prayers) and is usually translated as a "prayer hall" smaller than a mosque. It is usually used for conducting the five mandatory prayers or other prayers in (or without) a small congregation, but not for large congregation prayers such as the Friday prayers or the Eid prayers (the latter is conducted in congregational mosques in case there is no musalla, in the original meaning of open space, available). Such musallas are usually present in airports, malls, universities and other public places of Muslim-majority countries, as well as some non-Muslim countries, for Muslims to conduct their daily prayers. Usually, a musalla will not contain a minbar.

See also
Eidgah
Mosque 
Surau
Jama'at Khana

References

Islamic architectural elements
Islamic terminology
Rooms